Description of populations as white in reference to their skin colour predates and is distinct from the race categories constructed from the 17th century onward. Coloured terminology is occasionally found in Graeco-Roman ethnography and other ancient and medieval sources, but these societies did not have any notion of a white or pan-European race. In Graeco-Roman society whiteness was a somatic norm, although this norm could be rejected and it did not coincide with any system of discrimination or colour prejudice. Historically, before the late modern period, cultures outside of Europe and North America, such as those in the Middle East and China, employed concepts of whiteness. Eventually these were progressively marginalised and replaced by the European form of racialised whiteness. Whiteness has no enduring "true essence", but instead is a social construct that is dependent on differing societal, geographic, and historical meanings. Scholarship on race distinguishes the modern concept from pre-modern descriptions, which focused on skin colour, complexion and other physical traits.

Background 
Beginning with the rise of agricultural economies and the increasing stratification of societies around the world approximately 6000 years ago, light skin came to be increasingly associated with higher social status. Because lower status individuals were typically required to participate in arduous outdoor toil, dark skin began to be associated with lower social status in agricultural societies around the world. Over time whiteness became associated with happiness, success, freedom from outdoor toil, and even spiritual purity. In the ancient and medieval societies of Europe, Asia, and North Africa, light skin, especially among women, came to be a sign of living a privileged lifestyle, having noble ancestry, and also became an indicator of beauty.

Fertile Crescent

Mesopotamia 
In ancient Mesopotamia healthy skin colours were described as sāmu ("ruddy" or "reddish") or peṣû ("white") while ill-health was associated with the skin colour arqu ("pale-brown" or "yellow"), a reference to jaundice. Peṣû was descended from the Proto-Semitic word f/pṣḥ, which was related to whiteness and brightness. The word sāmu would also be used to refer to red hair, either dyed or natural, with natural red hair being associated with the Eurasian Steppe. For Akkadians, peṣû might also be used to refer to medical conditions such as albinism or severe anaemia or a woman's fair complexion. In contrast the Akkadian word ṣalmu ("black") would be used to describe people with dark skin, such as the Nubian pharaoh of Egypt's 25th Dynasty. Along with brown eyes, blue eyes or namru ("dazzling(-blue)), are also referred to in Mesopotamian writings.

Ancient Egypt 
According to anthropologist Nina Jablonski:

The Ancient Egyptian (New Kingdom) funerary text known as the Book of Gates distinguishes "four groups" in a procession. These are the "red-brown" Egyptians, the "pale" Levantine and Canaanite peoples or "Asiatics", the "black" "Nubians" and the "fair-skinned Libyans". The Egyptians are depicted as considerably darker-skinned than the Levantines (persons from what is now Lebanon, Israel, Palestine and Jordan) and Libyans, but considerably lighter than the Nubians (modern Sudan). Sex differences in skin colour were also depicted in Egyptian art, with women being depicted as noticeably lighter skinned than men. Men would be painted dark reddish-brown, while women could be painted "white, tan, cream, or yellow". Classical archaeologists typically ascribe this divergence to the differing lifestyles of men and women. According to Charles Freeman, depictions of women with light skin suggested a high status, and were a "sign that a woman did not have to work in the sun". As with other Mediterranean cultures, light skin came to be the feminine ideal in Egyptian art.

The Levant 
Ancient Greeks labeled the Phoenicians, and Levantines in general, as Phoinike, a word derived from the Greek work Phoinos, meaning "ruddy", possibly in reference to the skin colour of Ancient Levantines. In the Hebrew Bible, figures such as Esau and King David are described as "ruddy". According to scholar David M. Goldenberg, the ancient Israelites and Judean peoples preferred women with a "fair complexion". This preference is established in both biblical and post-biblical literature. For example, The Genesis Apocryphon describes Sarah as being "beautiful" in "her whiteness." A later scenario is written about by one of the Tannaim in which a potential groom refuses to marry a woman who he believes to be "ugly" and "black" (sḥehorah) until he finds out she is in fact "beautiful" and "white" (levanah). In the Song of Songs a woman praises her lover for being "white and ruddy" while she is described as "clear as the moon".

Goldenberg wrote:
A rabbinic text commenting on the skin diseases mentioned in the Bible (Leviticus, chs. 13–14; Deut 24:8), states: “An intensely bright white spot [baheret] appears faint on the very light-skinned [germani], while a faint spot appears bright on the very dark-skinned [kushi]. Rabbi Ishmael said: ‘The Jews—may I be like an expiatory sacrifice for them [an expression of love]—are like the boxwood tree [eshkeroae], neither black nor white, but in between.’”2 This statement records a second-century (R. Ishmael) perception that the skin color of Jews is midway between black and white.3 More precisely it is light brown, the color of the boxwood tree.4 This early perception of the intermediate, light-brown shade of the Jewish complexion is corroborated by a number of papyri from the Ptolemaic period in Egypt that describe the complexion of various Jews as “honey-colored.”

India 

The nature of skin colour and its role in the Indian caste system is strongly contested. According to the Indian sociologist G. S. Ghurye the groups mentioned in the Vedas, the Arya and Dasa, were distinguished by their skin colour or "varna" with the Arya being associated with a fair complexions and the Dasa being associated with dark complexions. Similarly, sociologist James Alfred Aho states that skin colour was used as a marker for what eventually became the caste system. Anthropologist Arthur Helweg states that the initial basis for the varna system was skin colour. Bengali scholar Jayantanuja Bandyopadhyaya records that in the Rigveda, the god Indra distributed the lands of the conquered Dasa to the "white-coloured" Arya. As such, Bandyopadhyaya characterises the conflict between the "white-skinned" Arya and "black-skinned" Anarya, or non-Aryans, as having racial overtones. The Indian Marxist historian D. D. Kosambi, wrote that the darker skin of the Dasyu "contrasted with the lighter skin-colour of the newcomers [Aryans]." The Mahabhashya, Ṛgveda, and Gopatha Brahmana contain, according to Kenneth A.R. Kennedy, references to Brahmins with "white skins and red or yellow hair." Per David Lorenzen, there are some references in later Vedic literature that suggest the Brahmin and Vaishya castes are referred to as "white or fair".  

The Indian scholars Varsha Ayyar and Lalit Khandare assert that colourism, or discrimination based on skin pigmentation, has existed in India since pre-colonial times, predating any Eurocentric concepts of whiteness. Similarly, the scholar Nina Kullrich submits that references to colour in Indian culture predate European colonialism and that although racism and colourism are linked together, they are not equivalent, with a desire for whiteness being a part of Indian culture that is distinguished from European concepts.

Others, such as Michael Witzel, state that the Rigveda uses  "black skin" as a metaphor for irreligiosity. The Indian historian Romila Thapar states that skin colour differences are more likely to be symbolic descriptors. Kadira Pethiyagoda also states that while varna does literally mean colour, and was used to classify groups of people and express differences, recent scholarship suggests these terms were symbolic.

Ancient Greece 

As with Ancient Egyptians, Mycenaean Greeks and Minoans generally depicted women with pale or white skin and men with dark brown or tanned skin. As a result, men with pale or light skin, leukochrōs (λευκόχρως, "white-skinned") could be considered weak and effeminate by Ancient Greek writers such as Plato and Aristotle. According to Aristotle, "Those whose skin is too dark are cowardly: witness Egyptians and the Ethiopians. Those whose skin is too light are equally cowardly: witness women. The skin colour typical of the courageous should be halfway between the two." Similarly, Xenophon of Athens describes Persian prisoners of war as "white-skinned because they were never without their clothing, and soft and unused to toil because they always rode in carriages" and states that Greek soldiers as a result believed "that the war would be in no way different from having to fight with women." 

In Greek literature women including goddesses such as Hera and Aphrodite and mortals such as Penelope, Andromache, and Nausicaa can be described as leukōlenos ("white-armed"). Athena is described as having golden-hair or xanthe and blue, green, or grey eyes. Contrarily male warriors like Odysseus were usually described as having brown or bronzed skin, unless attention was being brought to skin that was vulnerable to injury in battle. Greek visual art usually showed women as white, much lighter than the typical male. As a goddess of beauty, Aphrodite was usually given very white skin in both graphic and textual art. Whiteness was generally seen as a desirable part of femininity in Ancient Greek culture. 

Classicist James H. Dee states "the Greeks do not describe themselves as 'White people'—or as anything else because they had no regular word in their colour vocabulary for themselves." People's skin colour did not carry useful meaning; what mattered is where they lived. 

Later Xenophanes of Colophon described the Aethiopians as black and snub-nosed and the Thracians as having red hair and blue eyes. In his description of the Scythians, Hippocrates states that the cold weather "burns their white skin and turns it ruddy." 

The 2nd century Anatolian Greek sophist Polemon of Laodicea advocated a view of ancient physiognomy which attributed variations in skin and hair colour to the actions of the Sun. An anonymous 4th century Latin treatise, based on the work of Polemon, describes several stereotypes, including some related to skin colour, such as the claim that light-skinned "Northern" people are "courageous and bold and so forth". The Arabic translations of Polemon similarly includes white skin in a list of several traits held by Greeks of Hellenic or Ionian descent.

Ancient Rome 
The Caribbean scholar Mervyn C. Alleyne states that the Romans used the term candidus, a neutral term for white, to refer to themselves. Romans would also use the term albus, which referred to the physical phenomenon of whiteness, to refer to their skin colour. Vitruvius used candidus in his description for populations of northern Europe that "have huge bodies and are white in colour". The Roman writer Julius Firmicus Maternus would contrast the Germaniae candidi (white Germans) with Ethiopians, while Pliny spoke of Northern Europeans having candida atque glacialis cutis or "white and frosty skins". According to the Roman geographers Pomponius Mela and Pliny, a group of white Ethiopians (leukaethiopes), possibly a reference to lighter-skinned Berbers, inhabited the North African interior. The term candidus was later replaced during the Germanic invasion of Rome by the term blancus, which served a similar purpose, and which has survived in modern languages such as French blanc, Spanish blanco, Portuguese branco, and Italian bianco. Like candidus, blancus, was a neutral term used for Caucasian peoples.As with the ancient Greeks, the ancient Romans saw whiteness as an important part of feminine beauty. For example, in Virgil's Aeneid, Dido, the Phoenician queen of Carthage, and lover of Aeneas, is described as candida or "white". Virgil also refers to the goddess Venus as having "snow white arms". The Carthaginian poet Luxorius wrote disparagingly of the skin colour of Ethiopian women while praising the colour white as the ideal colour for women.

References to skin colour appear in Roman literature beyond references to women. Being unable to tell the difference between a white person and a black person was a common Roman idiom, used metaphorically to establish a state of ignorance. These idioms are attested in the writings of Cicero and Catullus. In the second of his Satires, the Roman satirist Juvenal writes "let the straight-legged man laugh at the club-footed man, the white man at the blackamoor", or "let a man who limps be mocked by a man who walks upright, let a Negro be mocked by a white man", although many varying translations are possible. In his fictional dialogue Hermotimus, the Hellenised Syrian satirist Lucian speculates on whether an isolated Ethiopian would assume out of hand that there are no "white or yellow" men on Earth.

Several Roman authors, such as Tacitus and Suetonius, expressed concerns in their writings about Roman "blood purity" as Roman citizens from outside of Roman Italy increased in number. Neither author, however, suggested that the naturalisation of new citizens should stop, only that manumissions (freeing slaves) and grants of citizenship should be less frequent. Their concerns of blood purity did not match modern ideas of race or ethnicity, and had little to do with features such as skin colour or physical appearance. Terms such as Aethiop, which Romans used for black people, carried no social implications, and though phenotype-related stereotypes certainly existed in Ancient Rome, inherited physical characteristics were typically not relevant to social status; people who looked different from the typical Mediterranean populace, such as black people, were not excluded from any profession and there are no records of stigmas or biases against mixed race relationships. The main dividing social differences in Ancient Rome were not based on physical features, but rather on differences in class or rank. Romans practised slavery extensively, but slaves in Ancient Rome were part of various different ethnic groups and were not enslaved because of their ethnic affiliation. According to the English historian Emma Dench, it was "notoriously difficult to detect slaves by their appearance" in Ancient Rome.

Late antiquity 

In late antiquity, some early Christian writers began connecting the metaphorical goodness and morality associated in European culture with the colour white to the physical skin colour itself, while at the same time associating the negative concepts attached to the colour black with dark skin. For example, the writer Paulinus of Nola claimed that Ethiopians had been turned black due to committing vices. Similarly Gregory of Nyssa believed that "Christ came into the world to make blacks white … Babylonians into Jerusalemites, the prostitute into a virgin, Ethiopians radiantly white." When speaking of baptising an Ethiopian, Fulgentius of Ruspe said he saw the Ethiopian as one who was "not yet whitened by the grace of Christ." According to a 7th century biography, Pope Gregory I bemoaned the presence of Anglo-Saxon child slaves in Rome who were "white of body and have blonde hair". In the 8th century, the English monk The Venerable Bede, generally associated the black skin of Ethiopians with "spiritual darkness" but at the same time rejected any idea that the colour differences between, as he termed it, "a black Ethiopian and a white Saxon" would affect their fates during the Last Judgement.

The 6th century Byzantine scholar Procopius referred to various invading barbarian tribes as being white, such as the Gothic tribes who he claimed had "white bodies and fair hair" and the Hephthalites or "White Huns" who, according to him, had "white bodies and countenances". Indian scholars also referred to the Hephthalites as Sveta Huna (White Huns). Hephthalites portrayed in the Sogdian art of the Afrasiab palace are shown as having pale or ruddy faces.

China 

The concepts of whiteness and white identity existed in pre-modern China, with the Chinese using whiteness as a non-racial social category that included themselves while excluding many non-Chinese peoples. While whiteness was used to identify and define Chinese people, Chinese culture did not exclusively apply the term to any single ethnicity, and other ethnic groups, such as Manchus and Europeans, could be described as white. Other groups, however, such as Indonesians, and Malaysians, were referred to as "black". Chinese culture also associated light skin with having a higher social status due to light complexions being a sign "freedom from manual labour".     

Scholars of Ancient China also describe Indo-European-speaking peoples of north-western China, such as the Yuezhi, as having "white" or "reddish white" skin. Similarly, the Wusun tribe are said to have had green eyes and red beards.

Muslim world 

 During and after the middle ages, the peoples of the Middle East used the term white to distinguish themselves from darker-skinned "others". "White", "red", and "black" became ethnic identifiers with "black" signifying inferiority. These colour terms became fixed after the initial Arab Conquests. Whiteness in this era became a valued physical attribute, with a white complexion being associated with the social elite.   

Middle Easterners noted that Europeans were "excessively white" with "pale blue" eyes. Muslim scholars of the Islamic Golden Age, such as Avicenna, described the northern tribes bordering the Muslim world as white; Avicenna writes: "The Slavs acquire whiteness / Until their Skins turn soft." The Arab explorer Ahmad ibn Fadlan during his northern travels detailed the Rus' people of the Viking Age as being "blonde and ruddy" and "big men with white bodies." The medieval Muslim sociologist Ibn Khaldun noted that those north of the Arabic-speaking world typically didn't use the term white:
The medieval Arab world used various terminology for people in reference to their skin colour with terms like al-bidan and al-abyad meaning "white people" and al-Sudan and Zanj meaning "black people". In general in the Arab world, the term "white" was used to refer to Arabs, Persians, Greeks, Turks, Slavs, and other peoples in the north. According to historian Arnold J. Toynbee, Arab rulers of the Umayyad Caliphate would sometimes refer to Persians and Turkish subjects as "the ruddy people", implying their racial inferiority. Despite this, some Islamic hagiographies record the Prophet Muhammad, as well as other Abrahamic figures, as having a "white or ruddy colour".

The term "white" was also used within Koranic exegesis as part of the "Curse of Ham". According to the 9th century scholar, Ibn Qutaybah, the religious writer and son of a companion of Muhammad, Wahb ibn Munabbih, related an interpretation of the story of Noah that stated Noah's son Ham had been a white man, but was later cursed by God to have his skin and the skin of his descendants turned black. As such Ham became the ancestor of all dark skinned people including Ethiopians, Nubians, Copts, and Berbers who were, according to other Islamic traditions related to the "Curse of Cannan", now also cursed to be bondsmen or slaves.

White slavery 

Different labels were used to categorise slaves in Islamic society, with white slaves being referred to as mamlūk ("owned") and blacks slaves referred to as abd ("slave") and white eunuchs referred to as jarādiyya ("locusts") and black eunuchs referred to as ghurābiyya ("ravens"). According to the Arab writer Al-Jahiz, the majority of white eunuchs in medieval Basra were Slavs. By the 10th and 11th centuries, white slaves from Spain, Sicily, and the Balkans could be purchased in the Muslim slave markets of Damascus and Baghdad. The Christian Arab intellectual Ibn Butlan of Baghdad wrote the first slave vade mecum, or handbook, in the 11th century, which recorded and described different ethnic and racial groups, dividing white slaves from black slaves and suggesting different tasks for each group based on their attributes. Ibn Butlan suggested that white slaves, such as Turks and Slavs, should be used as soldiers while black slaves should be used as labourers, servants, and eunuchs. Generally in the Arab world, white slaves came to be used to fill administrative and domestic positions while black slaves were used for rough labour. According to Bernard Lewis, white slaves could also conceivably become "generals, provincial governors, sovereigns and founders of dynasties", while such positions were rarely bestowed upon black slaves. Likewise, emancipated white slaves were offered more opportunities for social advancement in Arab society than emancipated black slaves.  

In medieval Southern Europe slaves came to be categorised based on colour with Christians using typical labels for Muslim slaves such as sarraceno blanco (white Saracen), sarracenno nigrium (black Saracen), and sarraceno lauram (Saracen of intermediate colour). In 13th century Barcelona the majority of Muslim slaves listed were classified as blanche (white). In 13th century Genoa slaves classified as albi (white) made up nearly half of the total recorded slave population. Records show Provencal France would also distinguish between noir (black) and blanc (white) slaves. In Islamic controlled Iberia (Al-Andalus) Muslims could own other Muslims as slaves, a practice usually banned within Islam, if the enslaved Muslims were either black or loro (of intermediate colour) but not if they were classified as white. Generally, in medieval Iberia and Italy, people were described as white, black, or of intermediate colour.

Christendom 

Medieval Christians seldom used "race" as a human category; the word emerged in 15th century Romance-language texts on animal husbandry, and writers tended instead to use words like gens and natio when classifying human groups. Medieval ideas about skin colour were complex. Dark skin – depicted in art using brown, black, blue, grey and sometimes purple hues – often signified negative moral and spiritual qualities distinct from physical appearance. Thus, the image of Saladin facing Richard I in the 14th century Luttrell Psalter depicts the Saracen with dark blue skin and a monstrous expression, even though the Muslims of the Levant at the time of the Third Crusade were predominantly light-skinned Mamluks. Christian theologians, for whom blackness represented sin and the devil, describe the newly baptised as "whitened" by the washing away of their sins.

Female beauty 

By the Late Middle Ages, the idealised, light-skinned features of high status figures in Gothic art signalled their moral purity, social rank, and political authority. The princesses of Chivalric romance and the noble ladies of courtly love literature similarly combined white skin with other positive social markers: slender proportions, graceful bearing, and expensive dress. 

The ideal of feminine beauty was formalised in the 12th century by Matthew of Vendôme in the Ars Versificatoria, which includes two descriptions Helen of Troy as a model. In the first example, her forehead is white as paper, the space between her eyes white and clear (a "milky way"), her colouring white and red (like rose and snow), and her teeth like ivory. In the second portrait, her forehead is like milk, teeth like ivory, neck like snow, legs fleshy (or white).

Chaucer 
According to the medievalist Candace Barrington:

Lower-class labourers ("churls") and drunkards typically have dark or ruddy faces and skin—for example, Perkyn Revelour ("brown and as berye") and the canon's yeoman (with a "leden hewe"). Dark skin is thus a consequence of "sin, sun, damnation, or putrefying flames", not a natural physical condition of certain groups of people. Chaucer's characters are all "by default, unrelentingly but invisibly white."

See also 
 Caucasian race
 Colour psychology
 Colour terminology for race
 Historical race concepts
 Light skin
 White people

References

Further reading 

 Graves, Robert (1948). The White Goddess: a Historical Grammar of Poetic Myth. United Kingdom: Faber & Faber.

People of European descent
Skin pigmentation
Race (human categorization)
White (human racial classification)